Hail the Artist is a 1973 French-Italian comedy film directed by Yves Robert.

Cast
 Marcello Mastroianni as Nicolas Montei
 Françoise Fabian as Peggy
 Jean Rochefort as Clément
 Carla Gravina as Elisabeth Montei
 Evelyne Buyle as Bérénice
 Henri-Jacques Huet as The director
 Lise Delamare as Lady Rosemond
 Sylvie Joly as The photographer's wife
 Hélène Vallier as The script
 Simone Paris as The theater director
 Maurice Barrier as Al Capone
 Dominique De Keuchel as Rodrigue
 Gérard Jugnot as The camera operator (uncredited) 
 Bernadette Robert
 Betty Beckers
 Claire Nadeau
 Lucienne Legrand
 Elizabeth Teissier (as Elisabeth Teissier)

References

External links

1973 films
1973 comedy films
French comedy films
Italian comedy films
1970s French-language films
Films directed by Yves Robert
Films about actors
Films with screenplays by Jean-Loup Dabadie
1970s French films
1970s Italian films
French-language Italian films